Joanna Andruszak (born Joanna Szarawaga, 2 April 1994) is a Polish handballer for MKS Lublin and the Polish national team.

Achievements
Mistrzostwa Polski:
Winner: 2014, 2015, 2016, 2017
Carpathian Trophy:
Winner: 2017

References

External links

1994 births
Living people
People from Dębno
Polish female handball players
21st-century Polish women